is a Japanese professional footballer who plays plays as a left-back for TSS Rovers in League1 British Columbia.

Early life
Beginning at age 12, Segawa played for SP Fute in his hometown of Ichikawa. At age 15, he left Japan to attend boarding school in England, where he also attended FAB Academy, an English National Sports Centre. He first attended Teikyo School London before switching to Queens' School, a secondary boarding school in nearby Hertfordshire.

Playing career
In 2016, Segawa played for Swedish Division 2 side Ånge IF.

In 2017, Segawa played for Finnish Kakkonen side PEPO, making 22 appearances that season and scoring three goals.

In 2018, Segawa joined Finnish Veikkausliiga side RoPS. That season, he made six league appearances and five in the Finnish Cup.

On 12 December 2018, Segawa signed with Finnish Ykkönen side AC Oulu. That season, he made nineteen league appearances and five in the Finnish Cup.

On 10 February 2020, Segawa signed with Canadian Premier League side York9 after he was identified by the league's centralized scouting system.

In March 2022, he signed for League1 British Columbia side TSS Rovers.

Career statistics

Notes

References

External links

1997 births
Living people
Association football defenders
Japanese footballers
People from Ichikawa, Chiba
Japanese expatriate footballers
Expatriate footballers in England
Japanese expatriate sportspeople in England
Expatriate footballers in Spain
Japanese expatriate sportspeople in Spain
Expatriate footballers in Sweden
Japanese expatriate sportspeople in Sweden
Expatriate footballers in Finland
Japanese expatriate sportspeople in Finland
Expatriate soccer players in Canada
Japanese expatriate sportspeople in Canada
Mar Menor FC players
Ånge IF players
Rovaniemen Palloseura players
AC Oulu players
York United FC players
Division 2 (Swedish football) players
Kakkonen players
Veikkausliiga players
Ykkönen players
Canadian Premier League players
PEPO Lappeenranta players
League1 British Columbia players
TSS FC Rovers players